

The Commonwealth of Nations Anzio War Cemetery is to be found about a kilometer from Anzio town in the Lazio region of Italy. It should not be confused with the Sicily–Rome American Cemetery and Memorial, which is for Americans and is located in Nettuno at the address "Piazzale Kennedy, 1".

Description and history
Anzio War Cemetery is a special and communal cemetery for the local and surrounding peoples. It contains 1,056 graves resulting from Operation Shingle in 1944 as part of World War II. Having seen the make up of the 1st Canadian Division which was sent there in 1944 it is clear from the graves that those who rest there were from the units of the 1st Division. There were 1,037 identified casualties.

Poem
There is poem about the Anzio War Cemetery written by Michael Elliott-Binns. It is written from the perspective of a man that had experienced a loss in the battle and that was writing for his own personal reasons. The author later commented that "They [the fallen soldiers] seem to be buried on the doorstep of their home."

Song
There is a line in a 2014 song "To Hell and Back" by Sabaton which was reportedly taken from a poem by Audie Murphy:
"Crosses grow on Anzio
Where no soldiers sleep
And where hell is six feet deep"

See also
 List of cemeteries in Italy

References

External links

 Image references
 

Burials in Lazio
Commonwealth War Graves Commission cemeteries in Italy
World War II operations and battles of the Italian Campaign
World War II cemeteries in Italy
Anzio